Dialium excelsum is a species of flowering plant in the family Fabaceae. It is native to the Democratic Republic of the Congo and Uganda. It is threatened by mining and forest clearing.

References

excelsum
Flora of the Democratic Republic of the Congo
Flora of Uganda
Endangered plants
Taxonomy articles created by Polbot